Walter Kolomoku (February 14, 1889 – May 6, 1930) was a Hawaiian steel guitar musician, actor, and recording artist. He has a cameo in D. W. Griffith's film The Idol Dancer. He recorded Southern Melodies Waltz No. 1 on Victor Records. He played the steel guitar.

His work includes recorded performances as part of the Hawaiian Quintette. He toured with Ernest Kaʻai. He left Honolulu and lived in New York for 20 years. He conducted the Hawaiian Conservatory of Music.

He recorded several songs on Victor records. He taught guitar and ukelele via correspondence classes. Musician Bob Dunn took the steel guitar courses as a young man.

Kolomoku recorded the album Southern Melodies in 1928 covering Southern classics on the steel guitar.

He married and had a son.

Discography
"Aloha Oe" (1911) by Queen Liliʻuokalani circa 1878, Edison Blue Amberola  Cylinder
"Kaua i ka huahuai" - Hawaiian War Chant (April 18, 1913) Victor 65339 Camden, New Jersey" as part of the Hawaiian Quintette
"Wailana" (1913) as partof the Hawaiian Quintette
Southern Melodies (1928)

References

1889 births
1930 deaths
20th-century American conductors (music)
Steel guitarists
20th-century American guitarists
Musicians from New York City
Musicians from Honolulu